Jan Epstein (1 October 1918 – 24 March 1988) was an Australian cricketer. He played one first-class match for Western Australia in 1945/46.

References

External links
 

1918 births
1988 deaths
Australian cricketers
Western Australia cricketers
Cricketers from Perth, Western Australia